Atractylodes is a genus of Asian flowering plants in the family Asteraceae.

Species
Atractylodes is native to eastern Asia.
 Atractylodes amurensis – Korea, Amur
 Atractylodes carlinoides – Hubei 
 Atractylodes japonica ( okera, Eastern ukera, ukira) – Japan, Korea, Manchuria, Inner Mongolia, Primorye
 Atractylodes koreana – Korean atractylodes – Korea, Liaoning, Shandong 
 Atractylodes lancea – Japan, Korea, Primorye, Myanmar, Vietnam, India
 Atractylodes macrocephala – China, Japan, Korea, Vietnam, India
 Atractylodes ovata – ovate-leaf atractylodes – Primorye, Amur, Khabarovsk, Japan, Korea, Manchuria, Inner Mongolia
 Atractylodes rubra

Medicinal uses
Some species, including Atractylodes lancea and A. macrocephala, are used in traditional Chinese medicine.

References

Cynareae
Plants used in traditional Chinese medicine
Asteraceae genera